John Wilkes Kittera (November 1752 – June 6, 1801) was an American lawyer and politician from Lancaster, Pennsylvania.

Kittera was born near Blue Ball, Pennsylvania.  He was appointed by President John Adams as United States attorney for the United States District Court for the Eastern District of Pennsylvania. He represented Pennsylvania in the United States House of Representatives from 1791 until 1801.

He is the father of Thomas Kittera.

External links

The Political Graveyard

1752 births
1801 deaths
People from Lancaster County, Pennsylvania
American Presbyterians
Pennsylvania lawyers
Federalist Party members of the United States House of Representatives from Pennsylvania
People of colonial Pennsylvania